Kotrapatti is a village in the Thanjavur taluk of Thanjavur district, Tamil Nadu, India.

Demographics 

As per the 2001 census, Kotrapatti had a total population of 741 with  379 males and  362 females. The sex ratio was 955. The literacy rate was 75.08.

References 

 

Villages in Thanjavur district